Elliott is a city in Montgomery County, Iowa, United States, along the East Nishnabotna River. The population was 338 at the time of the 2020 census.

History
Elliott was founded in 1879.

Geography
Elliott is located at  (41.149002, -95.162071).

Demographics

2010 census
As of the census of 2010, there were 350 people, 147 households, and 95 families living in the city. The racial makeup of the city was 99.1% White, 0.3% Native American, 0.3% Asian, and 0.3% from two or more races. Hispanic or Latino of any race were 0.9% of the population.

There were 147 households, of which 31.3% had children under the age of 18 living with them, 51.7% were married couples living together, 9.5% had a female householder with no husband present, 3.4% had a male householder with no wife present, and 35.4% were non-families. 32.0% of all households were made up of individuals, and 12.2% had someone living alone who was 65 years of age or older. The average household size was 2.38 and the average family size was 2.98.

The median age in the city was 39.6 years. 26.9% of residents were under the age of 18; 5.2% were between the ages of 18 and 24; 26.6% were from 25 to 44; 28.2% were from 45 to 64; and 13.1% were 65 years of age or older. The gender makeup of the city was 48.9% male and 51.1% female.

2000 census
As of the census of 2000, there were 402 people, 163 households, and 117 families living in the city. The racial makeup of the city was 99.25% White, 0.25% Asian, and 0.50% from two or more races.

There were 163 households, out of which 35.0% had children under the age of 18 living with them, 56.4% were married couples living together, 9.2% had a female householder with no husband present, and 28.2% were non-families. 25.8% of all households were made up of individuals, and 17.8% had someone living alone who was 65 years of age or older. The average household size was 2.47 and the average family size was 2.94.

In the city, the population was spread out, with 27.1% under the age of 18, 7.7% from 18 to 24, 28.9% from 25 to 44, 17.9% from 45 to 64, and 18.4% who were 65 years of age or older. The median age was 37 years. For every 100 females, there were 96.1 males. For every 100 females age 18 and over, there were 102.1 males.

The median income for a household in the city was $31,528, and the median income for a family was $35,114. Males had a median income of $28,750 versus $20,441 for females. The per capita income for the city was $15,018. About 11.6% of families and 14.9% of the population were below the poverty line, including 24.7% of those under age 18 and 9.9% of those age 65 or over.

Education
The Griswold Community School District operates area public schools.

Notable people
Elvin Bishop, inducted into the Rock and Roll Hall of Fame in 2015, a founding member of the historic Paul Butterfield Blues Band
Janet Thompson, basketball player

References

Cities in Iowa
Cities in Montgomery County, Iowa